Miloje Zečević (Serbian:  Милоје Зечевић; 1872-1946) was a high-ranking military officer in 1917 who belonged to the White Hand, along with his comrade-in-arms Mirko Milisavljević. Miloje Zečević also served as Minister of Defence, that is Minister of the Army and Navy of the Yugoslav government from 20 July 1921 to 3 January 1922. He was killed right after the Second World War by Tito's partisans in 1946.

References 

1872 births
1946 deaths
Black Hand (Serbia)
Yugoslav generals
20th-century Serbian people
19th-century Serbian people
Serbian generals
Yugoslav military personnel of World War II
Defence ministers of Serbia
Serbian military personnel of World War I
People killed by Yugoslav Partisans